People Like People Like People Like Us is the fifth studio album by the Swedish rock band Backyard Babies, released in 2006.  It was produced by Nicke Andersson from The Hellacopters.  Videos were made for the songs "The Mess Age (How Could I Be So Wrong)", "Dysfunctional Professional" and "Roads".

Track listing 
All songs are written by Backyard Babies, except where noted.

"People Like People Like People Like Us" - 2:00
"Cockblocker Blues" - 3:35
"Dysfunctional Professional" - 3:34
"We Go a Long Way Back" - 3:10
"Roads" - 4:23
"Blitzkrieg Loveshock" - 3:08
"The Mess Age (How Could I Be So Wrong)" - 3:30
"I Got Spades" - 3:03
"Hold 'em Down" - 2:49
"Heroes & Heroines" - 2:55
"You Cannot Win" - 3:34 (Nicke Andersson)
"Things to Do Before We Die" - 2:54

Personnel
Nicke Borg - Vocals, Guitar
Dregen - Lead guitar, Vocals
Johan Blomqvist - Bass
Peder Carlsson - Drums
Nicke Andersson - production, backing vocals. percussion, and lead guitar on "Roads"
Ant McMahon ~
Voice on people like people like people like you 

2006 albums
Backyard Babies albums